Duncan Joseph Greenwood  (16 October 1932 — 13 February 2010) was a British plant and agricultural scientist whose research included soil aeration and plant nutrition.

Greenwood attended Aberdeen University, graduating with a PhD in Soil Science in 1957.

He served as president of the International Committee of Plant Nutrition (1978-1982) and the British Society of Soil Science (1990-1992). He was elected Fellow of the Royal Society in 1985, and was appointed a CBE in 1993.

References 

1932 births
2010 deaths
Fellows of the Royal Society
Commanders of the Order of the British Empire
Alumni of the University of Aberdeen